Salwa Zeidan Gallery is a contemporary art gallery located within the Hilton Capital Grand airport road Abu Dhabi (United Arab Emirates), founded by Lebanese artist Salwa Zeidan in 1994. The gallery is specialized in contemporary art and has exhibited such artists as Hassan Sharif, Mohammed Kazem, and Nedim Kufi.

Artists

The gallery is known for collaborating with both emerging and renowned artists from UAE, Middle East as well as the rest of the globe. It currently works with over 60 artists, although it has official representation contracts with a select list of around 25. Some of the artists currently represented by the gallery are:

 Adonis (Adunis)
 Arman Stepanian
 Connie Noyes
 Fatema Al Mazrouie
 Hussain Sharif
 Hwang Seoung Woo
 Kourosh Salehi
 Marc Guiragossian
 Morvarid K
 Omar Zeidan
 Serwan Baran
 Reem Al Faisal
 [Rose Husseiny]
 Salwa Zeidan
 Saurabh Narang

List of previous exhibitions 

2014
 Collective Chemistry Collective exhibition. Artist:  Abdul Badi Abdul Musawwir, Alice Al Khatib, Dean Williams, Emmanuel Guiragossian, Fatema Al Mazrouie, Hassan Sharif, Hussain Sharif, Katya Traboulsi, Kourosh Salehi,  Mandy Kunze, Mohammed Abu El Naga, Mahammed Kazem, Nasser Palangi, Nives Widauer, Salwa Zeidan, Hwang Seoung woo and Zhuang Hong Yi.
 "Transformations" solo exhibition by Omar Zeidan
 Beirut Artfair ( ME.NA.SA.ART) Artists: Salwa Zeidan, Hussain Sharif, Habib Fadel, Paul Guiragossian and Adonis
 Expanding Horizon I collective exhibition. Artist:  Rahul Dutta, Adonis, Omar Zeidan, Hwang Seong- Woo, Fatema Al Mazrouie, Joelle Kudi, Alice Al Khatib, Marc Guiragossian, Rose Husseiny, Salwa Zeidan, John Van Alstine, Gheorghi Filin, Morvarid K.  Chritch and Abdul Badi Abdul Musawwir
 "MUALLAQAT" Solo Exhibition by Adonis
"Abu Dhabi calling Dubai" collaboration with Cube Art Gallery, Dubai. Artists: Abdul Badi Abdul Musawwir, Adonis, Daifallah, Bader Al Mansour, Fatema Al Mazrouie, Hala Al Khalifa, Hussain Sharif, Kourosh Salehi, Moataz Nazr, Nasser Palangi, Rahul Dutta and Saurabh Narang.
2013
 Abu Dhabi Art: Reza Derakshani, Hassan Sharif, Hussein Sharif, Reem Al Faisal, Fatema Al Mazrouie 
 "New Beginnings" - opening of the Saadiyat showroom, collective exhibition. Artists: Reza Derakshani, Adonis, Hassan Sharif, Rose Husseiny, Katya Traboulsi, Qassim Al Saedi, Omar Zeidan, Thomas Israel, Kourosh Salehi, Dean Williams, Mohamed Ahmed Ibrahim, Morvarid K. Rahul Datta, Salwa Zeidan

2011
 Abdul Badi Abdul-Musawwir Solo Exhibition
 Art Dubai 2011

2010
ADISS (Abu Dhabi International Sculpture Symposium)
 Sotheby's Auction, Doha, Qatar
 "Globe"
 Abu Dhabi Artfair 2010
 "Dropping Lines" Contemporary Emirati Art Show (with Hassan Sharif)
 Contemporary Romanian Art Exhibition
 Just Prints Show
 Bo Taslé d`Héliand

2009
 Adonis
 Abu Dhabi Art 2009
 NADIRA MAHMOUD
 Accrochages
 Rose Husseiny
 Contemporary Emirati Artists
 In Light

References

 http://www.alkhaleej.ae/alkhaleej/page/96628337-bc8b-44af-9064-
 http://www.thenational.ae/arts-lifestyle/art/salwa-zeidan-gallery-reopens-as-first-private-gallery-on-saadiyat-island
 http://forum.alrams.net/showthread.php?t=232513
 http://m.layalina.com/content/إفتتاح-غاليري-سلوى-زيدان
 http://www.aljarida.com/news/index/105918/النحت-في-واجهة-غاليري-سلوى-زيدان/tag:73
 http://www.gulfdailymail.com/2014/05/01/salwa-zeidan-gallery-to-host-solo-exhibition-for-the-greatest-living-poet-of-arab-world/
 http://daharchives.alhayat.com/issue_archive/Hayat%20INT/2009/2/26/قليل-من-الألوان-وكثير-من-الضوء-في-معرض-سلوى-زيدان-في-أبو-ظبي.html
 http://www.artsgulf.com/13551.html
 http://www.alraimedia.com/ar/article/culture/2009/02/24/101149/nr/nc
 http://www.al-watan.com/viewnews.aspx?n=C722F271-D840-4971-9191-7AE8B3CE05F7&d=20111203
 http://www.albayan.ae/five-senses/culture/2011-05-19-1.1440813
 http://www.france24.com/ar/20140520-أدونيس-شعر-سوريا-تغيير-النظام-المجتمع-مقابلة
 http://www.wam.ae/ar/news/emirates/1395236501450.html
 http://www.alittihad.ae/details.php?id=41483&y=2015
 http://www.emaratalyoum.com/life/four-sides/2010-02-16-1.62339

External links
 Salwa Zeidan Gallery reopens as first private gallery on Saadiyat Island 
 Art of the Middle East - Salwa Zeidan Gallery 
 Khaleej Times 
 Gulf News: Passion and Culture Find a Home in Abu Dhabi Passion and culture find a home in Abu Dhabi gallery
 AME Info -Salwa Zeidan Gallery 
 Art Dubai 
 Art of the Middle East 
 Art Facts - Salwa Zeidan Gallery 
 Official website 

1995 establishments in the United Arab Emirates
Art museums and galleries in the United Arab Emirates
Museums in Abu Dhabi
Arab art scene